Alive in London is a live album by drummer Shelly Manne, recorded at Ronnie Scott's Jazz Club in 1970 and released on the Contemporary label.

Reception

The AllMusic review by Scott Yanow states: "John Gross is easily the most impressive soloist but in general the well-intentioned music is not all that memorable".

Track listing
 "Three on a Match" (John Morell) - 10:14
 "Once Again" (Steve Bohannon) - 9:05  	
 "Big Oak Basin" (Gary Barone) - 9:20 
 "Illusion" (Terry Jones) - 6:27
 "Don't Know" (Morell) - 6:48

Personnel
Shelly Manne - drums
Gary Barone - trumpet, flugelhorn
John Gross - tenor saxophone
Mike Wofford - electric piano
John Morell - guitar
Roland Haynes - bass

References

1970 live albums
Contemporary Records live albums
Shelly Manne live albums
Albums recorded at Ronnie Scott's Jazz Club